Zwaagdijk-West  is a village in the Dutch province of North Holland. It is a part of the municipality of Medemblik, and lies about 3 km north of Hoorn.

The village was first mentioned in 1319 as buten den Zuoechdyc, and means "the dike belonging to Zwaag. Zwaagdijk-Oost is the settlement on the eastern side of the dike, Zwaagdijk-West is on the western side. In 1929, the Catholic Jacobus de Meerdere Church was built in Zwaagdijk-West.

References

Populated places in North Holland
Medemblik